Events during the year 1965 in Northern Ireland.

Incumbents
 Governor - 	The Lord Erskine of Rerrick
 Prime Minister - Terence O'Neill

Events
14 January – Taoiseach Seán Lemass travels to Belfast for an historic meeting with the Prime Minister of Northern Ireland Terence O'Neill. First meeting of Prime Ministers in 43 years.
21 January – Nationalist leader Eddie McAteer visits Taoiseach Seán Lemass in Dublin.
18 March – The Northern Ireland Minister for Agriculture, Harry West attends a meeting with his Southern counterpart, Charles Haughey, in Dublin.

Arts and literature
 Publication of Ten Poems by Michael Longley and Twelve Poems by Derek Mahon.

Sport

Football
Irish League
Winners: Derry City

Irish Cup
Winners: Coleraine 2 – 1 Glenavon

Births

January to June
2 January – Brian Irvine, composer.
6 January – Esmond Birnie, Ulster Unionist Party former MLA and author.
15 January – James Nesbitt, actor.
26 January – Seán Savage, member of the Provisional Irish Republican Army
20 February – Miriam Mone, fashion designer (died 2007).
2 March – Lembit Öpik, UK Liberal Party MP.
25 March – Jim Shannon, Democratic Unionist Party MLA.
27 April – Edwin Poots, Democratic Unionist Party MLA.
3 May – Gary Mitchell, playwright.
7 May – Norman Whiteside, footballer.
30 May – Briana Corrigan, singer.

July to December
1 July – Jackie McKernan, discus thrower.
20 July – Andy Black, poker player.
24 July – Frank Mitchell, television presenter.
22 September – Andy Cairns, songwriter and musician.
10 November – Eddie Irvine, racecar driver.
16 December – Noel Magee, boxer.

Full date unknown
Mark Carruthers, radio and television journalist.
Terence McNaughton, hurling player and manager.
Paul Seawright, artist.

Deaths
15 February – Sam Thompson, playwright (born 1916).
5 March – Helen Waddell, poet, translator and playwright (born 1889).

See also
1965 in Scotland
1965 in Wales

References 

 
Northern Ireland